The 1908 Michigan Agricultural Aggies football team represented Michigan Agricultural College (MAC) as an independent during the 1908 college football season. In their fifth year under head coach Chester Brewer, the Aggies compiled a 6–0–2 record and outscored their opponents 205 to 22.

Schedule

Game summaries

Michigan

On October 10, 1908, the Aggies played Michigan to a scoreless tie in East Lansing.  It was the fourth game in the Michigan–Michigan State football rivalry, and Michigan had won the three prior meetings by a combined score of 204 to 0. The game was played in front of 6,000 spectators at East Lansing's College Field, and the Aggies' fans "went wild with delight" when the game ended.  In Ann Arbor, the result was met with disbelief among Michigan fans who had expected an easy win.  The Detroit Free Press called it "the greatest game of football ever seen in this part of the state."  The Michigan Alumnus noted that Michigan's line was weak with Germany Schulz, Maurice Crumpacker and William Casey out of the game and opined that the Wolverines were outplayed and would have been defeated had it not been for Dave Allerdice repeatedly punting out of danger

References

Michigan Agricultural
Michigan State Spartans football seasons
Michigan Agricultural Aggies football